Edimax Technology Co., Ltd. is a Taiwanese manufacturer of data networking products. It also operates in the telephone and telegraph apparatus sector. The company was founded in 1986 and has been listed at the Taiwan Stock Exchange since 2001.

See also
 List of companies of Taiwan

References

External links

Open source software support

Manufacturing companies based in Taipei
Telecommunications companies of Taiwan
Networking hardware companies
Taiwanese companies established in 1986
Electronics companies of Taiwan
Companies listed on the Taiwan Stock Exchange
Taiwanese brands